Cunha Baixa is a freguesia in Mangualde, Portugal. The population in 2011 was 884, in an area of 15.52 km2.

References

Freguesias of Mangualde